Reşit Emre Kongar (born 13 October 1941) is a Turkish social scientist, academic, author, and columnist. As of July 2021, he regularly writes his column at Cumhuriyet.

Early life and education
Emre Kongar was born in 1941 in Istanbul, to İhsan Kongar, a philosophy teacher at Şişli Terakki High School and Pertevniyal High School and Mesude Kongar, also a philosophy teacher at Şişli Terakki High School and Zapyon High School. Engin, his older brother, died with Yalçın M., a mountain climbing fellow, following a fatal accident that happened in Demirkazık Peak, located in Toros Mountains on 8 September 1956.

He received his bachelor degree of public finance at Faculty of Political Science, Ankara University of Ankara University in 1963 and later studied Master of Social Work at Michigan State University until 1966.

Career
In 1968, Kongar founded Social Studies Academy at Hacettepe University, Ankara.

In 1983, Kongar was one of the earliest academics to protest Council of Higher Education of Turkey, the post-coup d'état formed high level education supervision board, based on his claim that İhsan Doğramacı to found and lead this board, who was also the founder of Bilkent University, a private university, would disrupt public property function of the state owned universities.

Between 1996 and 2000, until his retirement of academic profession, he lectured at Hacettepe, Yıldız Teknik and Istanbul Universities.

Kongar supported the March for Justice led by Republican People's Party and walked along Kemal Kılıçdaroğlu on 21 June 2017.

His book "İstanbul: 1940’lardan Bugüne Efsaneler Anılar İzlenimler" was published by Remzi Kitapevi in 2019.

Bibliography

Books
Source:

Publications

Notes

References

External links
Official Website
Cumhuriyet Newspaper Archive

1941 births
Living people
Writers from Istanbul
Hacettepe University alumni
Cumhuriyet people
Turkish secularists